State Route 97 (SR 97) is a  southwest-to-northeast state highway in the southwestern part of the U.S. state of Georgia. The highway's southern terminus is at the Florida state line, southwest of Faceville, where the roadway continues as County Road 269A to US 90 in Florida. Its northern terminus is at SR 37 in Camilla. The highway connects Faceville with Camilla, via Bainbridge, Vada, and Hopeful.

Route description

Decatur County
SR 97 begins at the Florida state line, at a point southwest of Faceville, where the roadway continues as County Road 269A (CR 269A) to US 90 in Florida. This is in the southwestern part of Decatur County. The highway travels to the north-northeast and crosses over Boykin Branch. An intersection with Frank Brown Road leads to a wildlife viewing area. Just past the northern terminus of Oaks Road North, the highway curves to the northeast. The highway crosses over North Mosquito Creek and then curves to the east-northeast. Just before an intersection with the southern terminus of Recovery Road, it begins a gradual curve to the east-southeast. After it curves back to the northeast, the highway intersects the southern terminus of SR 97 Spur (Hutchinson Ferry Road). It curves back to the east-northeast, and intersects the southern terminus of Faceville Landing Road, which leads to Faceville Landing. Then, in Faceville, it has an intersection with both the western terminus of SR 302 Spur (Faceville–Attapulgus Road) and the southern terminus of Woodyard Road. The highway then begins a gradual curve to the north-northeast. Then, it meets the northern terminus of SR 302. An intersection with the eastern terminus of Horseshoe Bend Road leads to Horseshoe Bend Park. The highway then crosses over Fourmile Creek. After this, the highway enters Bainbridge.

Just inside the city limits, the highway begins a curve to the northeast. On this curve, there is an intersection with the southern terminus of Old Quincy Highway (formerly the southern terminus of SR 97 Conn.). It then crosses over some railroad tracks of CSX just before a partial interchange with US 27/US 84/SR 1/SR 38. The highway immediately curves to the east and intersects SR 309 (West Street). Here, SR 97 turns left onto SR 309, and the two highways travel concurrently to the north; also, the roadway continues as East Louise Street. Between intersections with the eastern terminus of both West Eva Street and West Barber Street, SR 97 and SR 309 pass the Decatur County Health Department. Six blocks later, they turn right onto US 84 Bus./SR 38 Bus. (Shotwell Street) and follow those highways concurrently to the east. One block later, they meet US 27 Bus./SR 1 Bus. (Broad Street). Here, SR 97 and SR 309 turn left off of US 84 Bus./SR 38 Bus. and onto US 27 Bus./SR 1 Bus. The four highways travel to the north. Two blocks later, at an intersection with Broughton Street, the highways pass the city hall and Willis Park. Six blocks later, US 27 Bus./SR 1 Bus. leave the concurrency on Calhoun Street west, while SR 97 and SR 309 turn right onto Calhoun Street east. The two highways travel to the east. Just east of Independent Street, they curve to the northeast. They cross over another CSX railroad line just before an intersection with the eastern terminus of Back Street. They intersect the southern terminus of SR 311 (East River Road) and curve to the east. A short distance later, they curve back to the northeast.

After leaving Bainbridge, they cross over Big Slough just before splitting. The roadway gradually curves to the north-northeast and then to the north. At the southern terminus of Adolph Brock Road, it curves back to the northeast. The highway intersects SR 262. The two highways begin a brief concurrency. They curve to the north-northeast and enter Vada. There, SR 262 splits off to the east and SR 97 enters the southwestern part of Mitchell County.

Mitchell County
After leaving Vada, SR 97 curves to the north. It then curves to the north-northeast. In Hopeful, it intersects SR 65. About  later, the highway begins to curve to the east-northeast and has an intersection with the northern terminus of SR 311. It travels through Greenwood. It begins to curve to the east and crosses over Big Slough Creek. It begins to curve back to the east-northeast and passes the Camilla–Mitchell County Airport. The highway enters the southwestern part of Camilla. It curves to the east-southeast and intersects SR 112 (Cairo Road). The two highways travel concurrently to the north-northeast. When they split, SR 112 continues to the north-northeast, concurrent with SR 37 Truck, which begins at this intersection, while SR 97 turns left to the north. The highway meets its northern terminus at SR 37. Here, the roadway continues as South Butler Street. On the southeastern corner of this intersection is the City of Camilla Public Safety Complex.

History

Major intersections

Special routes

Bainbridge connector route

State Route 97 Connector (SR 97 Conn.) was a  connector route that began at an intersection with the SR 97 mainline, in the southern part of Bainbridge. It headed northeast, curved to the northwest and curved back to the northeast to meet its northern terminus, an interchange with US 27/US 84/SR 1/SR 38 in the western part of the city. Here, the roadway continues as US 84 Bus./SR 38 Bus. (West Shotwell Street). SR 97 Conn. was decommissioned in 2015

Faceville spur route

State Route 97 Spur (SR 97 Spur) is a  spur route of SR 97 completely within the southwestern part of Decatur County. It begins at an intersection with the SR 97 mainline (Faceville Highway), southwest of Faceville. It heads northwest and ends at a barricade, just shy of the shores of Lake Seminole.

See also

References

External links

097
Transportation in Decatur County, Georgia
Transportation in Mitchell County, Georgia